Bryan D. Muir (born June 8, 1973) is a Canadian former professional ice hockey defenceman who played 279 games in the National Hockey League, winning a Stanley Cup Championship with the Colorado Avalanche in 2001. He last played with the Frankfurt Lions in the Deutsche Eishockey Liga during the 2008–09 season.

Playing career

Muir went undrafted through his junior career with the University of New Hampshire and signed his first pro contract with the Edmonton Oilers. Muir is considered a journeyman defenceman having also played stints for the New Jersey Devils, Chicago Blackhawks, Tampa Bay Lightning, Colorado Avalanche, Los Angeles Kings and the Washington Capitals.

His most distinguished year came in the 2005–06 season for the Capitals where he played 72 games for 8 goals, 18 assists and 26 points.

On August 5, 2008, Muir signed with Belarusian club HC Dinamo Minsk to participate in the newly formed KHL. Minsk released him after 23 games in the KHL, and in early January 2008 he signed with German club Frankfurt Lions for the remainder of the DEL season; after the Lions' quick exit from the 2009 DEL playoffs the club declined to offer Muir a contract extension.

Muir joined senior MLH team the Brantford Blast in 2011.

Career statistics

Awards and honours

References

External links

1973 births
Living people
Albany River Rats players
Canadian ice hockey defencemen
Canadian people of Scottish descent
Chicago Blackhawks players
Colorado Avalanche players
Detroit Vipers players
Edmonton Oilers players
Espoo Blues players
Frankfurt Lions players
Hamilton Bulldogs (AHL) players
Hershey Bears players
HC Dinamo Minsk players
Ice hockey people from Winnipeg
Los Angeles Kings players
Manchester Monarchs (AHL) players
Modo Hockey players
New Hampshire Wildcats men's ice hockey players
New Jersey Devils players
Portland Pirates players
Stanley Cup champions
Tampa Bay Lightning players
Toronto Marlies players
Undrafted National Hockey League players
Washington Capitals players
Canadian expatriate ice hockey players in Belarus
Canadian expatriate ice hockey players in Finland
Canadian expatriate ice hockey players in Germany
Canadian expatriate ice hockey players in Sweden